Hylodesmum glutinosum is a species of flowering plant in the family Fabaceae. Common names include large tick-trefoil, clustered-leaved tick-trefoil, large-flowered tick-clover, pointed tick-trefoil, beggar's lice and pointed-leaved tick-trefoil. It occurs in eastern Canada, the central and eastern United States, and northeastern Mexico.

Taxonomy
First described in 1802 as Hedysarum glutinosum and sometimes considered part of the genus Desmodium, it was transferred to the new genus Hylodesmum (tribe Desmodieae) in 2000.

References

Desmodieae
Flora of North America